Amblyptilia bowmani is a moth of the family Pterophoridae that can be found in North America.

References

Moths described in 1923
Amblyptilia
Moths of North America